Baronessen fra benzintanken (The Baroness from the Gas Station) is a 1960 Danish comedy film directed by Annelise Reenberg and starring Maria Garland, Ghita Nørby, Dirch Passer and Ove Sprogøe.

Cast
 Maria Garland - Dowager baroness Alvilda von Rosensteen
 Ghita Nørby - Anne Tofte/von Rosensteen
 Karin Nellemose - Baroness Henriette von Rosensteen / Den Grå Dame (The Grey Lady)
 Dirch Passer - Hans Høy
 Ove Sprogøe - Lars Tofte
 Karl Stegger - Frederiksen, the butler
 Ulla Lock - Gerda, the housemaid
 Emil Hass Christensen - Berg, lawyer
 Henrik Wiehe - Henning Rabenfeldt
 Erni Arneson - Clarissa Rabenfeldt
 Henny Lindorff Buckhøj - Tora, the housekeeper
 Vivi Svendsen - The Cook
 Karen Berg - Astrid von Pleum, governess
 Bjørn Puggaard-Müller - Lord-in-Waiting Heidenfeldt-Oxenholm
 Lili Heglund - Baroness-in-Waiting Heidenfeldt-Oxenholm

References

External links

1960 films
1960s Danish-language films
1960 comedy films
Films directed by Annelise Reenberg
Films scored by Sven Gyldmark
Danish comedy films